Harlan Spring Historic District is a national historic district located at Hedgesville, Berkeley County, West Virginia. It encompasses seven contributing buildings related to the early settlement of Berkeley County.  They include the Spring Hill log house (ca. 1740), The Harlan Cottage (c. 1860), "The Willows" (c. 1812), and Lingamfelter House.

It was listed on the National Register of Historic Places in 1980.

References

Historic districts in Berkeley County, West Virginia
Historic districts on the National Register of Historic Places in West Virginia
Houses in Berkeley County, West Virginia
National Register of Historic Places in Berkeley County, West Virginia